Shelly Dass-Manning is a Trinidadian journalist who worked as a television news presenter in Trinidad and Tobago through May 2010. She was anchor of the nightly newscast on Cable News Channel 3.

Childhood and early career
Dass was born and raised in the oil community of Pointe-a-Pierre, south Trinidad. Her father was a senior employee of Texaco, Trintoc, and state-owned Petrotrin for many years. She was educated at St Peters' Private Primary School in Pointe-a-Pierre, St. Joseph's Convent, and later, Oral Roberts University in the United States, where she studied broadcast journalism. She is the holder of a master's degree from the University of London.

Anchorwoman
Dass was a news anchor at both CCN TV6 (where she started in September 1998) and Trinidad and Tobago Television, prior to her stint at Cable News Channel 3. She was a co-presenter of Morning Edition and later the anchor of the News At Ten on TV6, and the CCN TV6 news at 7, before moving to the anchor chair at TTT's Panorama. She briefly returned to TV6 in 2005, before joining CNC3. She was also the producer and moderator of the current affairs programme The Big Story on CNC3. With Dass as both producer and host, the show won 4 awards for analysis and coverage three months into its airing. Dass returned to Trinidad in 2015 and was carded to be the moderator of the Prime Minister's Debate between then Prime Minister, Kamla Persad-Bissessar and then Opposition Leader, Dr. Keith Rowley. This debate however, never happened. In 2015, Dass returned to CNC3 to anchor the station's 10 year anniversary newscast along with former anchors Odeka O'Neil Seaton and Roger Sant. She would stay with the company and be promoted to Head of News of the Guardian Media Limited, parent company of CNC3 taking up responsibility for news and editorial content of CNC3 and the Guardian newspaper.

Personal life
On September 6, 2008, Dass wed Robert Clarke, a producer and reporter at Gayelle TV, in a million dollar beachfront ceremony at a private family owned resort in Tobago.  Clarke is the great great grandson of Captain Arthur Andrew Cipriani, former Trinidad & Tobago politician, mayor, and trade union leader. Clarke, a journalist and writer, met Dass during a cabinet press conference in Port of Spain. The couple is divorced and share one child together.

On December 12, 2020, after having a highly-publicized, adulterous affair, Dass wed Brian Manning , a Trinidadian and Tobagonian politician, in a small, intimate wedding at Stollmeyer's Castle, in Port of Spain, Trinidad. Manning is the son of former Prime Minister of Trinidad and Tobago, the late Patrick Manning, and former education minister Hazel Manning.

References

Trinidad and Tobago television personalities
Living people
Year of birth missing (living people)
Oral Roberts University alumni
Alumni of the University of London